Abraham Hoagland Cannon (also reported as Abram H. Cannon) (March 12, 1859 – July 19, 1896) was a member of the Quorum of the Twelve Apostles of the Church of Jesus Christ of Latter-day Saints (LDS Church).

Personal history
Cannon was born in Salt Lake City, Utah Territory. His parents were George Q. Cannon, a Latter Day Saints apostle, and Elizabeth Hoagland, daughter of Abraham Hoagland.

Cannon studied at Deseret University. Later, he studied architecture under Obed Taylor.

Marriages
Cannon married Sarah A. Jenkins on October 16, 1878. Cannon practiced plural marriage. He married his second wife, Wilhelmina Mousley, on October 15, 1879. On March 17, 1886, Cannon was convicted under the Edmunds Act of unlawful cohabitation and sentenced to six months' imprisonment and a fine of $300. Despite this conviction, Cannon married his third and fourth wives—Mary E. C. Young on January 11, 1887, and Lilian Hamlin on June 17, 1896.

Cannon was pardoned in 1894 by U.S. President Grover Cleveland.

Publisher
In 1882, at the age of 23, Cannon assumed business control of the Juvenile Instructor and associated publications. He continued his management until his death.

In October 1892, Cannon and his brother John Q. Cannon took control of the Deseret News publishing. He also became the editor and publisher of The Contributor.

LDS Church service
On October 9, 1882, Cannon became a member of the First Seven Presidents of the Seventy of the church.

On October 7, 1889, church president Wilford Woodruff named Cannon a member of the Quorum of the Twelve Apostles. He was ordained an apostle on that date by Joseph F. Smith. Cannon served in this capacity until his death.

Death
Early in the summer of 1896, Cannon visited California, where he presumably visited the ocean, swam in it, and got ocean water trapped within his ear. This led to an ear infection, and by mid-July Cannon was seriously ill. He underwent at least one surgery to relieve pressure and drain the infection, but the illness continued. Cannon died on July 19 at the age of 37 in Salt Lake City.

Works

References

Further reading 
 Firmage, Edwin Brown and R. Collin Mangrum. Zion in the Courts: A Legal History of the Church of Jesus Christ of Latter-day Saints, 1830–1900. Urbana: University of Illinois Press, 2001. 
 Hardy, B. Carmon. Solemn Covenant: The Mormon Polygamous Passage. Urbana: University of Illinois Press, 1992. 
 "Swears Mormon Chiefs Broke Polygamy Pact; Apostle Cannon's Widow Tells of Plural Marriage in 1896". The New York Times, December 15, 1904.
Van Wagoner, Richard S. Mormon Polygamy: A History. 2nd ed. Salt Lake City, Utah: Signature Books, 1992.

External links

 Abraham Hoagland biography
 Abraham H. Cannon materials at L. Tom Perry Special Collections, Harold B. Lee Library, Brigham Young University

1859 births
1896 deaths
American Latter Day Saint writers
American general authorities (LDS Church)
American people convicted of bigamy
American prisoners and detainees
Apostles (LDS Church)
Burials at Salt Lake City Cemetery
Cannon family
Latter Day Saints from Utah
People convicted of cohabitation
People of Utah Territory
Presidents of the Seventy (LDS Church)
Prisoners and detainees of the United States federal government
Recipients of American presidential pardons